Paidia moabitica is a moth of the family Erebidae. It was described by Josef J. de Freina in 2004. It is found in Jordan.

References

Nudariina
Moths described in 2004